Finchley Progressive Synagogue (FPS) is a Liberal Judaism congregation in North Finchley in North London. The Rabbi is Rebecca Birk. Synagogue membership is around 350 families.

History
Finchley Liberal Jewish Congregation was first established in 1953. The congregation initially met at North Finchley Library, in private houses and at Moss Hall School. The existing synagogue in Hutton Grove was built as Finchley Liberal Jewish Synagogue in 1964, and received the name Finchley Progressive Synagogue in 1971.
Previous rabbis at FPS have been Charles Familant, S. Gerstein, Frank Hellner (1966–1999), Rabbi Mark Goldsmith (1999–2006) and Rabbi Neil Janes (c.2006–2010). The current rabbi, Rebecca Birk took up office in 2011.

Current activities
The synagogue has actively campaigned on behalf of Syrian refugees, working together with Citizens UK and Middlesex University Students Union. In October 2015 Barnet Council became the first Conservative-run local authority district to resettle refugees under the Syrian Vulnerable Persons Resettlement Scheme, agreeing to admit 50 Syrian refugees. The synagogue has continued to provide support to the refugees, and in October 2018 the Council pledged to continue to offer sanctuary to child refugees.

FPS has been characterised as an 'urban eco synagogue'. It was one of four synagogues which established the 'eco synagogue' concept in January 2018, with a mix of adult education about climate change and practical environmental initiatives such as minimizing food waste.

References

1953 establishments in England
Liberal synagogues in the United Kingdom
Religion in the London Borough of Barnet
Synagogues completed in 1964
Synagogues in London